The Port Orange Causeway, commonly called the Port Orange Bridge or the Dunlawton Bridge, spans the Halifax River and Intracoastal Waterway in Port Orange, Volusia County, Florida. The bridge carries approximately 29,000 vehicles per day across four lanes of State Road A1A and Dunlawton Avenue.

History

First bridge
The first bridge at this location was built by the Port Orange Bridge Company (owned by S. H. Gove) in 1906, made of sable palm pilings and pine bridge timbers. In 1918, Gove offered to sell the bridge to Volusia County. The bridge was severely damaged by a hurricane in 1932, and was torn down. Port Orange was without a bridge for many years after the disaster.

Second bridge
A bascule bridge was finally built here as a replacement in 1951. The two-lane drawbridge was paid for with tolls. The bridge connected the two ends of Dunlawton Avenue, from the mainland to the beach peninsula.

Third bridge

In May 1987, the U.S. federal government agreed to provide $8.16 million of the estimated $12 million cost of building a Port Orange, Florida bridge planned to be similar to the Granada Bridge. After the drawbridge had aged and was expensive to maintain, it was replaced in 1990 by a new four-lane high bridge, which carries State Road A1A over the river. The Florida State Legislature designated the new bridge as the Congressman William V. Chappel Jr. Memorial Bridge.

See also
 List of crossings of the Halifax River

References

Gallery

External links

 History of Port Orange
 Port Orange Images

Causeways in Florida
Bridges in Volusia County, Florida
Bridges over the Halifax River
Road bridges in Florida
Buildings and structures in Port Orange, Florida
Bridges completed in 1990
Former toll bridges in Florida
1990 establishments in Florida
Concrete bridges in the United States
Girder bridges in the United States